Tan Sri Datuk Seri Dr. Fong Chan Onn  (born 29 February 1944) is a Malaysian politician and a former Minister of Human Resources. He is a former vice-president of the Malaysian Chinese Association (MCA), a component party of the then-ruling Barisan Nasional (BN) coalition. He served as a Member of Parliament for Selandar from 1999 to 2004 and Alor Gajah from 2004 until 2013.

Profile
Fong received his bachelor's degree in electrical engineering from the University of Canterbury in New Zealand. He went on to receive his MBA and PhD in Operations Research/Industrial Economics from University of Rochester, New York.

He began his career in the civil service as an engineer at the Kuala Lumpur Telecommunications Department. He later joined the Faculty of Economics and Administration at the University of Malaya, rising to become Dean in 1990.

Political career
Fong was elected as the Member of Parliament for Selandar in the 1990, 1995, 1999 general elections and for Alor Gajah constituency in the 2004, 2008 general elections .

Fong became an MCA vice-president in 1996, but stepped down after the 2008 MCA elections when he lost his bid for re-election.

From 1990 to 1999, he served as Deputy Minister of Education. Following the 1999 general elections, Fong was appointed Minister of Human Resources. He remained in that ministry until 2008, when he left the Cabinet, and retired from Parliament at the 2013 election.

Post retirement, he became the Chairman of Enterprise Asia, a non-governmental organisation (NGO) that is set up to champion entrepreneurship development in Asia.

Election results

Honours

Honours of Malaysia
  :
  Commander of the Order of Loyalty to the Crown of Malaysia (PSM) – Tan Sri (2010)
  :
  Companion Class I of the Exalted Order of Malacca (DMSM) – Datuk (1993)
  Knight Commander of the Exalted Order of Malacca (DCSM) – Datuk Wira (2003)
  Grand Commander of the Exalted Order of Malacca (DGSM) – Datuk Seri (2005)

Personal life
Fong is also an avid photographer and has won awards for his images. For two consecutive years he has won The Societies Photographer of Year (2018  and 2019 ) gaining international success for his photography.

See also
Selandar (federal constituency)
Alor Gajah (federal constituency)

References

External links
 Official blog

 
 
 

1944 births
People from Negeri Sembilan
Malaysian people of Cantonese descent
Malaysian engineers
Government ministers of Malaysia
21st-century Malaysian politicians
University of Rochester alumni
Living people
Malaysian politicians of Chinese descent
Malaysian Chinese Association politicians
University of Canterbury alumni
Malaysian Buddhists
Members of the Dewan Rakyat
Commanders of the Order of Loyalty to the Crown of Malaysia